Andrés Alejandro Loforte (born July 25, 1979) is an Argentine judoka, who competed in the men's half-heavyweight category. He held a 2002 Argentine senior title for his own division, picked up a total of fourteen medals in his career, including three bronze from the Pan American Judo Championships, and also represented his nation Argentina at the 2004 Summer Olympics.

Loforte qualified for the Argentine squad in the men's half-heavyweight class (100 kg) at the 2004 Summer Olympics in Athens, by placing third and receiving a berth from the Pan American Championships in Margarita Island, Venezuela. He conceded with a koka score and a shido penalty, and succumbed to a kuchiki taoshi hold from Egypt's Bassel El Gharbawy during their opening match.

References

External links

1979 births
Living people
Argentine male judoka
Olympic judoka of Argentina
Judoka at the 2004 Summer Olympics
Sportspeople from Córdoba, Argentina
South American Games silver medalists for Argentina
South American Games medalists in judo
Competitors at the 2002 South American Games
20th-century Argentine people
21st-century Argentine people